Nova Bandeirantes is a municipality in the state of Mato Grosso in the Central-West Region of Brazil.

The municipality contains part of the  Juruena National Park, one of the largest conservation units in Brazil.

See also
List of municipalities in Mato Grosso

References

Municipalities in Mato Grosso